Francis Vinton Greene (June 27, 1850 – May 13, 1921) was a United States Army officer who fought in the Spanish–American War. He came from the Greene family of Rhode Island, noted for its long line of participants in American military history.

Biography
Greene was born in Providence, Rhode Island, on June 27, 1850. He attended the United States Military Academy at West Point and graduated in 1870. He first served in the U.S. artillery and then transferred to the Corps of Engineers in 1872. He next served as an attaché from the War Department to the U.S. legation in St. Petersburg, Russia. While there he served in the Russian army during its war with Turkey. He was promoted to first lieutenant in 1874 and captain in 1883. He returned to the U.S. and was a civil engineer to the city of Washington, D.C. and was a professor of artillery at West Point before resigning from the Army on December 31, 1886. He published multiple articles on the development of modern warfare and U.S. military policy.

When the Spanish–American War broke out he raised the 71st New York Volunteer Infantry and was commissioned as its colonel on May 2, 1898. He was quickly promoted to brigadier general of Volunteers on May 27, 1898. He commanded the second Philippine Expeditionary Force which became the 2nd Brigade, 2nd Division, VIII Corps. Greene took a prominent part in the Battle of Manila in 1898. He assisted in the surrender negotiations for Manila. In August 1898 he was promoted major general of Volunteers and resigned on February 28, 1899. During his service, he was put in charge of the finances of the preliminary Philippine administration. In September 1898, he briefed President McKinley on the Philippine situation and recommended the annexation of the entire archipelago. He wrote to William R. Day and William McKinley that he and Admiral Dewey agreed that the Philippines should not be divided, and it would be much better to hold the islands as one. He expected British agreement. 

After the war, he pursued a variety of occupations. He was a delegate to the Republican National Convention in 1900. He served as the New York City Police Commissioner from 1903 to 1904. He was president of the Niagara-Lockport and Ontario Power Company, along with other business ventures with Buffalo businessman John J. Albright. He died on May 13, 1921, in New York City.

Legacy
Greene's family holds a distinguished place in American military history. His father was Civil War general, George Sears Greene, famous for his defense of Culp's Hill at the Battle of Gettysburg. His older brother, Samuel Dana Greene, was the executive officer of the USS Monitor during the Battle of Hampton Roads. All were from Rhode Island.

Publications
His publications include a series of works on military campaigns, including:
 
 
 
 
 

 Greene also wrote a biographical sketch in a collection of Theodore Roosevelt's political writings entitled, "American Ideals", originally published 1897 and subsequently republished for Roosevelt's presidential campaign in 1900.

See also
 Battle of Manila (1898)

References

External links

 
 Battle of Raymond
 Arlington National Cemetery

 

United States Army generals
American military writers
New York City Police Commissioners
American military personnel of the Spanish–American War
Burials at Arlington National Cemetery
1850 births
1921 deaths
New York (state) Republicans
United States military attachés
United States Military Academy alumni
Greene family of Rhode Island